Woodville Independent School District is a public school district based in Woodville, Texas (USA).

Located primarily in Tyler County, the district extends into a small portion of Polk County.

In 2009, the school district was rated "academically acceptable" by the Texas Education Agency.

Schools
Woodville High (Grades 9-12)
Woodville Middle (Grades 6-8)
Woodville Intermediate (Grades 3-5)
Wheat Elementary (Grades PK-2)

References

External links
Woodville ISD

School districts in Tyler County, Texas
School districts in Polk County, Texas